The 1923 Kraków riot was a violent riot that took place during a strike on 6 November 1923 in Kraków, Poland. The incident is also called the 1923 Kraków uprising, particularly by Marxist sources.  Demonstrators took control of the Main Market Square area and disarmed some troops.  Eventually troops and police were ordered to fire on the workers, though some soldiers refused. Three armored cars were used, one of which, named Dziadek ("Grandpa"), was captured by the workers in the Market Square area. Some 18–30 workers were killed, as well as 14 soldiers.  No policemen died, but 31 were injured.

Background 
Poland regained independence in 1918 (see Partitions of Poland), in the aftermath of the First World War, but was involved in several military conflicts, such as Polish-Soviet War, till late 1920. After the wars, the newly reconstituted country had to deal with a difficult economic situation, including economic depression and hyperinflation. Workers rights were curtailed, their material situation drastically worsened, and Polish socialists were in opposition to the coalition government of Endecja and Chjeno-Piast, with Wincenty Witos as prime minister. At the same time, Witos and his men were afraid that Józef Piłsudski, who for the time being was staying in his estate in Sulejowek, would use any opportunity to return to power. The Marshall was officially presenting himself as a private person, but his house was carefully watched by the police.

In the fall of 1923, hundreds of strikes took place across the country. At first, Polish government adopted a lenient policy towards worker demonstration, but after a scandal in 1922, in which a carriage with Polish president was pelted by stones by the workers while police did nothing, this policy changed. In October 1923, railroads were militarized, and the striking rail workers were drafted into the army. In Kraków, where workers' strikes and demonstrations were occurring as well, local military commander, General Józef Czikiel, introduced special courts for striking rail workers. In response, on November 5, Polish Socialist Party proclaimed a general strike.

Riots in Kraków 
On 5 November the government forbade any demonstrations, yet this decree was disregarded by the workers of Kraków. Therefore, troops, some of them armed with machine guns, were deployed on the streets of the city, and on crucial positions across the city early in the morning on November 6. A day earlier, Polish Socialist Party (Polska Partia Socjalistyczna, PPS) had declared a general strike as in response to government militarization of the railways (ordered in order to end a month-long strike of the railway workers) and other restrictions. Workers clashed with the police, but the situation didn't progress further on that day.

Another large workers demonstration begun in late morning of 6 November, resulting in events described in some sources as Bloody Tuesday. It all started when the protesters approached Worker's House, located at Dunajewskiego Street, where a demonstration was planned for that day. However, the House was locked, and in front of it were the police, some of them with rifles and bayonets. Angry workers came closer to the police, and then one of the officers, positioned in a nearby hotel, fired at the crowd. It was the spark that ignited the crowd. The demonstrators rushed at the police, disarming some of the officers. At the same time, a Polish Army regiment, called to help the police, appeared in the Planty Park. The workers began chanting "Long live Józef Piłsudski", and upon hearing that, the soldiers put down their weapons, honoring their beloved commandant. Soon afterwards, rifles were in the hands of the demonstrators, many of whom were well-trained veterans of the Polish-Soviet War.

Since the situation was getting very serious, local authorities called uhlans of the 8th Regiment, under Rotmistrz Lucjan Bochenek, an experienced soldier, who ordered his subordinates to charge on the crowd, but horses were unable to run on the wet sidewalks, and many of them slipped and fell. The workers dispersed, with a number of them hiding in nearby houses, where they opened fire. Bochenek, and his deputy Mieczyslaw Zagorski were killed, and shocked uhlans were disarmed. Another cavalry unit was also disarmed, and its commandant, shot in both legs, was unable to control the soldiers, who, after hearing workers chant "Long live Pilsudski! Down with the government of Witos!", mingled with the crowd, giving up their weapons.

Upon order of General Czikiel, Colonel Becker was left in charge of the army units sent to fight the demonstrators. Becker, finding out about failure of the mounted troops, sent into action infantry regiments, which on previous night had been transported from Katowice and the area of Lwow. Meanwhile, workers were erecting barricades and clashing with the police and troops units again. The Internationale was sung. The demonstrators took control of the Main Market Square area and disarmed some troops. Eventually, troops and police were given orders to fire on the workers, although some soldiers refused to do so. Three Armored cars were used; one of which, named Dziadek, was captured by the workers in the area of the market square. The driver of the armored car was killed, two other soldiers inside were seriously wounded.

Around midday of November 6, the center of the city was under control of the workers, with police and army units stationed around Kraków Main station, and offices of the voivode. At that time, rumors began circulating among the demonstrators, which had it that large army units with artillery were on their way. However, the government in Warsaw, anxious about the situation, had already begun negotiations with the opposition, and a five-hour truce was declared, which prevented further fighting. Altogether, about 18 to 30 workers and 14 soldiers were killed (including 11 cavalryman from an ill-fated charge), and there were 101 soldiers wounded. No policeman were killed, but 31 were injured. Among the civilians, 10 were seriously wounded. Also, the demonstrators killed 61 army horses.

Aftermath 
By 6 November the Polish government declared that it was willing to negotiate with PPS, a ceasefire was agreed upon, and the riots subsided. The government agreed to reverse its decision about militarization of the railways; the unpopular voivode of Kraków Voivodeship, Kazimierz Gałecki, was replaced by Karol Olpiński; and General Józef Czikel (commander of the Kraków Military District No. V) was replaced by Lucjan Żeligowski. In return, the socialists promised to end the strike, and urged all workers to return to work the next day. In Kraków, the police withdrew from the streets, which temporarily were patrolled by the armed workers.

The increasingly unpopular Chjeno-Piast government would resign in December 1923, partly due to its handling of the Kraków riots. Apart from Kraków, in early November 1923 there were violent street demonstrations and clashes with police in other southern Polish cities, such as Tarnów, and Boryslaw, with a number of people wounded, as well as killed. All killed cavalrymen were buried at Kraków's Rakowicki Cemetery, where a monument with their names was erected.

See also 
September Uprising (Communist unrest in Bulgaria)

Notes 

Protests in Poland
Krakow riot
1923 riots
20th century in Kraków
Labor disputes in Poland
Revolutions of 1917–1923
Riots and civil disorder in Poland
November 1923 events in Europe
History of Lesser Poland Voivodeship
1923 protests